The World Federation for the Metallurgic Industry (FMM) was a global union federation representing workers in the metalworking industry.

The federation was established at a meeting in Essen, in August 1920, as the International Federation of Christian Trade Unions of Metal Workers.  It held its first congress in November 1921 in Turin, when it agreed its statutes.  It established offices in Utrecht, and affiliated to the International Federation of Christian Trade Unions.

By 1934, the federation had affiliates in Belgium, Czechoslovakia, France, Hungary, the Netherlands, Poland, Switzerland, and Yugoslavia, with a total of 96,656 members.  By 1979, this had grown to 500,000 members.

The federation voted to dissolve in 1983, believing that, with members in eight countries, it could not achieve effective action.  Although it undertook no further activity, on 14 October 1985, it was officially merged with the International Federation for the Graphical Industries, the International Federation of Christian Miners' Unions, and the World Federation of Energy, Chemical and Various Industry Workers' Unions, forming the World Federation of Industry Workers.

References

Metal trade unions
Global union federations
Trade unions established in 1920
Trade unions disestablished in 1985